The Echo class was a class of inshore survey vessels built for the British Royal Navy in 1958–1959. The class was designed to operate in close waters such as harbour approaches, shipping lanes, rivers and estuaries. Together, the ships of this class formed the Royal Navy's Inshore Survey Squadron.

Description
The class consisted of three ships, and were of composite (wood on metal frames) construction. They had a large superstructure with an open bridge on top. They were crewed by 5 officers and 34 ratings, with accommodation on board for 4 officers and 18 rates.

Service history

All ships were sold out of service in 1985. The Marine Society acquired two of the three vessels circa 1985 and converted them to training vessels. They were modified, from plans loaned by the Port of London Authority who had already purchased HMS Polsham in 1967 and converted her to a survey vessel, Maplin. The two vessels were renamed, Jonas Hanway and Earl of Romney, and were initially based and operated in conjunction with the Gravesend Sea School on the Thames at Denton. The third vessel is thought to have been included within the disposal package by the Ministry of Defence and acted as a spare parts source for the two operational vessels.

Ships
 , built by J Samuel White, Cowes, commissioned 12 September 1958, sold 1985 (scrapped for spares)
 , built by WM Blackmore & Sons, Bideford, commissioned 1959, sold 1985 (renamed Earl of Romney)
 , built by William Weatherhead & Sons, Cockenzie, commissioned 1959, sold 1985 (renamed Jonas Hanway)

See also
 , the Royal Navy's latest survey vessels, launched in 2002.

References

 Warships of the Royal Navy, Captain John. E. Moore RN, Jane's Publishing, 1979

Auxiliary research ship classes
 
Ship classes of the Royal Navy